The Waltz Queen may refer to:

 The Waltz Queen (Patti Page 1955 album), a 1955 Patti Page album issued on Mercury Records
 The Waltz Queen (Patti Page 1958 album), a 1958 Patti Page album issued on Wing Records